Chetan is a common Indian and Nepalese first name for males. The Hindi word means 'Spirit Full' or 'Full of Consciousness'; the name is derived from the Sanskrit word 'Chaitanya'.

Chetan may refer to:
Chetan Anand (badminton), badminton player from India
Chetan Anand (director) (1921–1997), Hindi film producer, screenwriter and director
Chetan Baboor (born 1974), Indian international table tennis champion
Chetan Bhagat (born 1974), Indian author, columnist, and speaker
Chetan Chauhan (1947-2020), former Indian cricketer and Member of Parliament
Chetan (actor), Tamil television and film actor
Lucian Chetan (born 1985), Romanian football player
Chetan Eknath Chitnis (born 1961), Principal Investigator into malaria at ICGEB, New Delhi
Chetan Hansraj, Indian Television actor
Chetan Joshi, flautist in the Hindustani Classical Music tradition
Chetan Hansraj, former model and Indian Film and television actor popular for portraying villain roles in TV serials.
Chetan Kumar (born 1984), Kannada film actor
Chetan Patel (born 1972), former English cricketer
Kris Chetan Ramlu, New Zealand musician, 
Chetan Sakariya, Indian Cricketer
Chetan Sharma (born 1966), medium pace bowler who was a member of the Indian cricket team
Chetan Sosca, Indian playback singer
Chetan Suryawanshi (born 1985), Indian born cricketer

References

See also
Aniyan Bava Chetan Bava, 1995 Malayalam comedy musical film
Chhota Chetan, 1998 Hindi movie directed by Jijo Punnoose
Chetan Nagar, village in Belgaum district in the southern state of Karnataka, India
Chetouane

Indian given names